Klinge station is a railway station in the Klinge district in the municipality of Wiesengrund, located in the Spree-Neiße district in Brandenburg, Germany.

References

Railway stations in Brandenburg
Buildings and structures in Spree-Neiße